Eisenhower House, formerly known as the Commandant's Residence or Quarters Number One of Fort Adams, is a historic house that is part of Fort Adams State Park in Newport, Rhode Island.

History
The building was built by George C. Mason & Son in 1873. Its first inhabitant was General Henry Jackson Hunt. Dwight D. Eisenhower used the house as his summer residence during his presidency in 1958 and 1960. Initially, in 1958, the President was living at the Naval War College on Coasters Harbor Island. However, with his passion for golf, he moved to this location as it was close to the Newport Country Club. It then became the "Eisenhower House" and the Summer White House.

Today
The Eisenhower House became part of Fort Adams State Park after the U.S. Navy transferred Fort Adams to the State of Rhode Island in 1964. The residence was added to the National Register of Historic Places in 1974. It is used for weddings and other social events.

See also

National Register of Historic Places listings in Newport County, Rhode Island
 List of residences of presidents of the United States

References

External links
Rules for use/renting

Houses on the National Register of Historic Places in Rhode Island
Houses completed in 1873
Houses in Newport, Rhode Island
National Register of Historic Places in Newport, Rhode Island
Historic district contributing properties in Rhode Island
1873 establishments in Rhode Island